Aeonium, the tree houseleeks, is a genus of about 35 species of succulent, subtropical plants of the family Crassulaceae. Many species are popular in horticulture. The genus name comes from the ancient Greek αἰώνιος / aiōnios (ageless). While most of them are native to the Canary Islands, some are found in Madeira, Cape Verde, Morocco, in East Africa (Ethiopia, Somalia, Uganda, Tanzania and Kenya) and Yemen.

Description
The succulent leaves are typically arranged on a basal stem, in a dense, spreading rosette. A feature which distinguishes this genus from many of its relatives is the manner in which the flowers bear free petals, and are divided into 6 or 12 sections. Each rosette produces a central inflorescence only once, and then dies back (though it will usually branch or offset to produce ensuing rosettes).

Low-growing Aeonium species are A. tabuliforme and A. smithii; large species include A. arboreum and A. valverdense. They are related to the genera Sempervivum, Aichryson and Monanthes, as can be seen by their similar flower and inflorescences. Recently, the genus Greenovia has been placed within Aeonium.

Species and distribution 
All but two species are native to at least one of three different Macaronesian archipelagos (the Canary Islands, Madeira, or Cape Verde) Most aeoniums are from the Canary Islands, The only species not native to these three Macaronesian island groups (Aeonium stuessyi and Aeonium leucoblepharum) are found in Ethiopia, Kenya and Tanzania; and Ethiopia, Kenya, Sudan, Uganda and Yemen, respectively. Aeonium arboreum is native to both the Canary Islands and Morocco.

Hybrids 
Much hybridising has been done, resulting in several cultivars of mixed or unknown parentage. The following species and cultivars have gained the Royal Horticultural Society’s Award of Garden Merit:-

Aeonium tabuliforme 
Aeonium haworthii 
Aeonium haworthii 'Variegatum' 
Aeonium 'Blushing Beauty' 
Aeonium 'Sunburst' 
Aeonium 'Zwartkop'
Hybridising between Aeonium species or cultivars and other Crassulaeceae species or cultivars has produced intergeneric crosses:

 x Semponium '''Sienna' (Sempervivum ‘Green Ice’ x Aeonium ‘Ice Warrior’).
 x Semponium 'Destiny' - winner of the Royal Horticultural Society Chelsea Flower Show 'Chelsea Plant of the Year 2022' award.

Some species have been introduced in California.

UK national collections of aeoniums are held by Mellie Lewis at Clun in Shropshire and by Inverewe at Poolewe, Wester Ross in Scotland.

Selected species

 Aeonium aizoon Aeonium appendiculatum Aeonium arboreum Aeonium aureum Aeonium balsamiferum Aeonium canariense Aeonium castello-paivae Aeonium ciliatum Aeonium cuneatum Aeonium davidbramwellii Aeonium decorum Aeonium glandulosum Aeonium glutinosum Aeonium gomerense Aeonium gorgoneum Aeonium goochiae Aeonium haworthii Aeonium hierrense Aeonium leucoblepharum Aeonium lindleyi Aeonium nobile Aeonium sedifolium Aeonium simsii Aeonium smithii Aeonium spathulatum Aeonium tabuliforme Aeonium undulatum – saucer plant
 Aeonium urbicum Aeonium valverdenseImages

References

 R. Nyffeler, "Aeonium", in Urs Eggli, ed. Illustrated Handbook of Succulent Plants: Crassulaceae'' (Springer, 2003) 
 M. Cristini, "The Genus Aeonium" (Rome, 2022) 

 
Crassulaceae genera